The 2014 Provo Premier League is the 16th season of top-tier football in the Turks and Caicos Islands. It began on 18 January 2014 and will end in April 2014.

League table

Results

References

Provo Premier League
Turks
Turks